The women's 200 metre breaststroke competition of the swimming events at the 1955 Pan American Games took place on 24 March. The last Pan American Games champion was Dorotea Turnbull of Argentina.

This race consisted of four lengths of the pool, all in breaststroke.

Results
All times are in minutes and seconds.

Heats

Final 
The final was held on March 24.

References

Swimming at the 1955 Pan American Games
Pan